Oliver Martin may refer to:

 Oliver Óge Martyn, Irish Jacobite and landowner
 Oliver Martin (cyclist), American cyclist
 Oliver Martin (skater), British figure skater and artistic roller skater